Tall Kohneh (also Romanized as Toll Kohneh; also known as Torkāneh and Tūl Kohneh) is a former village in Tashan-e Sharqi Rural District, Tashan District, Behbahan County, Khuzestan Province, Iran. The former villages of Tall Kohneh, Ablesh, Chahardahi-ye Sohrab, Chahardahi-ye Asgar, Deh-e Ebrahim & Masiri came together to create the city of Tashan. At the 2006 census, its population was 279, in 62 families.

References 

Populated places in Behbahan County